Shoptime is a Brazilian home shopping channel, currently owned by B2W Digital. The channel was founded on November 6, 1995. It is the most-watched shopping channel in Brazil.

Ciro Bottini is a key-person in the channel, one of the longest-lasting presenters, presenting a program of computer and electronics since 1995.

Current Programs
Assim é Fácil ("That's Easy")
Casa & Conforto ("Home & Comfort")
Conectados  ("Connected")
Muda Tudo Shoptime ("Change Everything Shoptime")
Vida Leve  ("Light Life")
Você Sempre Mais ("You Always More")

Current Presenters
Adriana Tolentino
André Saporetti
Andréa Bueno
Barbara Marttins
Ciro Bottini
Davi Lopes
Fabiana Boal
Flavia Bonato
Raphaela Palumbo

Old Programs
EletroInfo
Mundo Feminino ("Female World")
Prime Time
TV UD ("TV Household")
Top 10
Saúde e Beleza ("Health & Beauty")
Infoshop

Old Presenters
Carlos Takeshi
Gabriel Taco
Guilherme Almeida
Juliana Coelho
Marcos Veras
Mauro Jardim
Milton Waley
Monique Evans
Ramon Gonçalves
Reinaldo Rocha
Roberta Close
Rodolfo Bottino
Viviane Romanelli

External links
 
- Shoptime at LyngSat Address

References 

Television networks in Brazil
Shopping networks
Companies based in Rio de Janeiro (city)
Portuguese-language television stations in Brazil
Television channels and stations established in 1995
Mass media in Rio de Janeiro (city)